Swami Vivekanand Inter-State Bus Terminus (ISBT) popularly known as Anand Vihar ISBT, located in East Delhi is one of the three Inter State Bus Terminals in Delhi. Anand Vihar ISBT was built in 1993, but it became fully functional with effect from March 1996. It is spread over an area of approximately 25 acres and operates bus services between Delhi and two other states, Uttar Pradesh and Uttarakhand.

Background
Delhi has one of India's largest bus transport systems. Buses are the most popular means of transport catering to about 60% of Delhi's total demand. The Kashmere Gate ISBT, opened in 1976 was the only ISBT in Delhi till 1993 when it was transferred to the Transport Department of Government of Delhi. In order to decongest the Overcrowded Kashmere Gate ISBT, two new ISBT's were created in Sarai Kale Khan and Anand Vihar. The Anand vihar ISBT, located in trans-Yamuna region focused mainly on passenger traffic from eastern part of Delhi, from the States of Uttar Pradesh and Uttarakhand.

The Terminal
The ISBT at Anand Vihar is the city's closest link to neighbouring states of Uttar Pradesh and Uttarakhand, with 1,400-1, 500 inter-state buses plying from the bus terminus to these states every day. The local DTC and cluster buses also ply from Anand Vihar ISBT, where around 1,800 to 2,000 local buses operate every day. Built in 1993, the inter-state bus terminus is one of the busiest transport hubs in the area, connecting east Delhi with the rest of the city and the NCR through Metro. Day-to-day functioning of the ISBT is managed under the control of a general Manager, who is subordinated by Deputy General Manager, Accounts Officer, Executive Engineer and other staff including the Engineering, financial and administrative. Besides one estate manager is posted to lookafter the functioning of the ISBT.

Renovation
After the renovation of Kashmere Gate ISBT in 2013, there have been plans to renovate ISBT Anand Vihar. The Delhi Development Authority forwarded a proposal on behalf of DIMTS to the Delhi Urban Arts Commission in 2012 regarding the renovation. The ISBT was to be developed by DIMTS on an area of 9.2 hectares in an estimated cost of Rs 200 crore. The project, once started, was likely to take 20 months for completion.

Connections
Anand Vihar ISBT is located adjacent to the Anand Vihar Terminal railway station and Anand Vihar metro station. In 2003, Union Railway minister Nitish Kumar announced that Delhi would get a new rail terminal at Anand Vihar. The station was commissioned in the 2003 rail budget The Anand Vihar Terminal railway station was officially inaugurated on 19 December 2009 by the then Union railway minister, Mamata Banerjee and the Chief Minister of Delhi, Sheila Dikshit. The terminal, spread over 42 hectares (100 acres) is one of the largest railway stations and caters to East–bound trains from Delhi.
Anand Vihar metro station was inaugurated on 6 January 2010 by Sheila Dikshit and Union Minister for Urban Development, S. Jaipal Reddy.

See also
 Transport in Delhi
 Anand Vihar Terminal railway station
 Anand Vihar metro station

References

Transport in Delhi
Bus stations in India